The jack of clubs or Jack of Clubs (also called the "knave of clubs") is a playing card in the standard 52-card deck.

Jack of Clubs may also refer to:

Jack of Clubs (album), an album by Paul Motian
Jack of Clubs Creek, a creek in British Columbia, Canada
 Jack O'Clubs, a 1924 American silent crime film directed by Robert F. Hill

See also

 or 

 Ace of Clubs (disambiguation)
 Jack of Diamonds (disambiguation)
 Jack of Hearts (disambiguation)
 Jack of Spades (disambiguation)
 Queen of Clubs (disambiguation)
 King of Clubs (disambiguation)
 Knave (disambiguation)
 Knave of Clubs, a former pub in London